Potassium chromate is the inorganic compound with the formula K2CrO4.  This yellow solid is the potassium salt of the chromate anion.  It is a common laboratory chemical, whereas sodium chromate is important industrially.

Structure
Two crystalline forms are known, both being very similar to the corresponding potassium sulfate.  Orthorhombic β-K2CrO4 is the common form, but it converts to an α-form above 66 °C. These structures are complex, although the chromate ion adopts the typical tetrahedral geometry.

Production and reactions
It is prepared by treating potassium dichromate with potassium hydroxide:
K2Cr2O7(aq) + 2KOH -> 2K2CrO4 + H2O
Or, the fusion of potassium hydroxide and chromium trioxide:
2KOH + CrO3 -> 2K2CrO4 + H2O
In solution, the behavior of potassium and sodium dichromates are very similar.  When treated with lead(II) nitrate, it gives an orange-yellow precipitate, lead(II) chromate.

Applications
Unlike the less expensive sodium salt, potassium salt is mainly used for laboratory work in situations where an anhydrous salt is required.  It is as an oxidizing agent in organic synthesis.  It is used in qualitative inorganic analysis, e.g. as a colorimetric test for silver ion. It is also used as an indicator in precipitation titrations with silver nitrate and sodium chloride (they can be used as standard as well as titrant for each other) as potassium chromate turns red in the presence of excess of silver ions.

Occurrence
Tarapacaite is the natural, mineral form of potassium chromate. It occurs very rarely and until now is known from only few localities on Atacama Desert.

Safety
As with other Cr(VI) compounds, potassium chromate is carcinogenic. The compound is also corrosive and exposure may produce severe eye damage or blindness. Human exposure further encompasses impaired fertility, heritable genetic damage and harm to unborn children.

References

Potassium compounds
Chromates
Oxidizing agents